The River Erkina is a river that flows through the county of Laois in Ireland. It is a tributary of the River Nore.

It has its source on the Laois-Kilkenny border south of Rathdowney. It flows north towards Rathdowney and then turns east in the direction of Durrow entering the River Nore around 1.5 km east of the town.

See also
Rivers of Ireland

References

Rivers of County Laois